Rugh may refer to:

 Carrie Rugh (born 1961), American figure skater
 Roberts Rugh (1903-1978), American biologist